Cossulus herzi is a moth in the family Cossidae. It is found in Iran, Afghanistan, Uzbekistan and Kyrgyzstan.

References

Natural History Museum Lepidoptera generic names catalog

Cossinae
Moths described in 1893
Moths of Asia